Countess Sophia Sergeyevna Ignatieva (born as Princess Meshcherskaya (княжна Мещерская)) was the child of Prince Vladimir Meshchersky's first cousin. Countess Sophia had eight houses in Petrograd and was a landowner of Rzhev uyezd. Playing an important role in clerical circles, she reportedly was an adherent of Bishop Hermogenes and priest Heliodorus, first friends later opponents of Grigori Rasputin. Countess Sophia Ignatieva introduced Rasputin to Milica of Montenegro and her sister Anastasia, who were interested in Persian mysticism, spiritism, and occultism. She lived to be 94 years old.

Notes

Countesses of the Russian Empire
Russian princesses
1850 births
1944 deaths